The British Society of Gerontology, is a learned society in the United Kingdom dedicated to enhancing knowledge about ageing and later life. It is a member of the Academy of Social Sciences.

External links

References

Learned societies of the United Kingdom
Scientific organisations based in the United Kingdom
Academic organisations based in the United Kingdom